The Central District of Khash County is a district (bakhsh) in Khash County, Sistan and Baluchestan province, Iran. At the 2006 census, its population was 111,114, in 21,170 families.  At the 2016 census, its population was 101,498.  The district has two cities: Khash and Esmailabad. The district has four rural districts (dehestan): Esmailabad Rural District, Karvandar Rural District, Kuh Sefid Rural District, and Sangan Rural District.

References 

Khash County
Districts of Sistan and Baluchestan Province
Populated places in Khash County